After the de facto merger on 1 November 1954 and before the legal integration with the Indian Union on 16 August 1962, general elections were held in 1955 and 1959. So. the first general elections to the Pondicherry Representative Assembly (French: Assemblée représentative de Pondichéry) along with 16 municipal councils were held in 1955 from July 18 to 23 for 39 constituencies to constitute First Pondicherry Representative Assembly (French: Première Assemblée représentative de Pondichéry). The election were held on the basis of adult franchise under the State of Pondicherry (Representation of the People: French: Représentation du peuple) Order, 1955 which prescribed the rules and regulations for the conduct of elections, more or less on the pattern adopted in the Indian Union. The elections were conducted under supervision of the Election commissioner Mr. Sukumar Sen and heavy polling was reported during the elections.

Results
The results of 1955 elections are
 

Congress barely secured a majority of 20 seats out of 39 these seats. Congress won 9 out of 12 from Karaikal, 8 out of 22 from Pondicherry, 1 out of 3 from Mahe and 2 out of 2 from Yanam. However, In Yanam, both seats won in an uncontested manner. In Pondicherry, the Congress did not fare well. The Congress did not secure seats in Pondicherry city and the surrounding areas. All the 8 seats in Pondicherry that were won by Congress came from the liberated areas of Nettapakkam, Mannadipet (Tiroubouvané) and Bahour communes. People's Front (Communist) (Makkaḷ Munnaṇi (Tamil:மக்கள் முன்னணி)) won 13 seats out of 22 from Pondicherry and 3 seats out of 12 seats from Karaikal. However, three members who won on People's Front ticket joined Congress later.

Members of the 1955 Pondicherry Representative Assembly
Source: 

 After the Death of Pakkiriswamy Pillai, his seat fell vacant in Karaikkal in 1956. Later a by election was conducted and P. Shanmugam got elected as the sixth councillor from Karaikkal.  Shanmugam was an erstwhile People's Front member from Nedungadu constituency.

Government formation
On 9 August 1955 Then chief commissioner of Pondicherry, Mr. Kewal Singh also informed the leaders of the both Congress and People's Frony parties that unlike his predecessors during French rule, he would refrain from using his powers to nominate half of the six-membered Government-in-council (equivalent to council of ministries in Indian state assemblies). He assured that the assembly members can elect all the six members. 

On 12th August 1955, chief commissioner then  invited the Congress led by Maurice Pakkirisami Pillai for the formation of government. Thus, the Congress with the support of independents was able to form a Government. The chief opposition party was the Communist (i.e. People's Front) with 12 seats. 

On 26th August 1955, putting into rest any speculations about merger with neighbouring states, the first Pondicherry Representative Assembly demanded that Pondicherry should remain as a separate state within India.

Cabinet
Initially, Maurice Pakkiriswamy Pillai led the Pondicherry Representative Assembly from 17 August 1955 until his death in January 1956. Then, a five-member new cabinet was formed and led by Édouard Goubert. It had Eduard Goubert, Chandrasekhara Chettiar, Mohammed Yusoof, S. Dakshinamoorthy Mudaliar and Thiagraja Naicker.

Aftermath
However, the government was not stable. There were frequent crossings of the floor by the Legislators, and the ruling party was ridden with personal strifes and factions. The Government of India had to intervene finally by dissolving the Assembly and the Chief Commissioner, L.R.S. Singh, took over the administration on 28 October 1958. Later, after nine months, elections were held in 1959.

See also

Puducherry Legislative Assembly
1946 French India Representative Assembly election
1951 French India Representative Assembly election
1959 Pondicherry Representative Assembly election

Notes

References

State Assembly elections in Puducherry
French India
Elections in France
Pondicherry